Courts of Guam include:

 Local courts of Guam

 Judicial Council of Guam
Supreme Court of Guam
 Superior Court of Guam

Federal courts located in Guam

 District Court of Guam

References 

Guamanian law